Hyalella azteca is a widespread and abundant species complex of amphipod crustacean in North America. It feeds on algae and diatoms and is a major food of waterfowl.

Description
Hyalella azteca has body plan similar to most amphipods and is a classic freshwater example of the order. Their color is variable, but the most frequent hues are white, green and brown.

They are identified from other similar species by antenna 1 being equal or shorter than antenna 2, 1 spine on each plate 3rd and 4th from the last on the dorsal side, Pereopod I and II are gnathopod with males having a visibly larger gnathopod.

Distribution
Hyalella azteca is found across Central America, the Caribbean and North America, as far north as the Arctic tree line. It lives among vegetation and sediments in permanent bodies of freshwater, including lakes and rivers, extending into tidal fresh water, and freshwater barrier lagoons. It is "the most abundant amphipod of lakes [in North America]", with golf course ponds sometimes supporting large populations.

Ecology
In contrast to other species of Hyalella, H. azteca is extremely common and has wide ecological tolerances. It can tolerate alkaline waters and brackish waters, but cannot tolerate a pH lower (more acidic) than 6.0.

The main foodstuffs of H. azteca are filamentous algae and diatoms, although they may also consume organic detritus. It cannot assimilate either cellulose or lignin, even though these biomolecules are a major component of the leaf litter. It can, however, assimilate 60%–90% of the bacterial biomass that it ingests.

Hyalella azteca is an important food for many waterfowl. In Saskatchewan, 97% of the diet of female white-winged scoters was observed to be H. azteca, and it also makes up a significant part of the diet of lesser scaup.

Insecticide resistance
Some H. azteca have evolved insecticide resistance. This does however conflict with their need to adapt to climate change: Fulton et al 2021 finds some of their mechanisms of resistance impose a fitness cost under higher temperatures.

Life cycle
Hyalella azteca passes through a minimum of nine instars during its development. Sexes can first be distinguished at the 6th instar, with the first mating occurring in the 8th instar. Subsequent instars, of which there may be 15–20, are considered adulthood.

Uses
Hyalella azteca are used in various aquatic bioassays  (also called toxicity tests). Because of their wide distribution, ease of captive reproduction, and its niche in lake sediments, Hyalella azteca are used in aquatic toxicology assays in sediments  Hyalella azteca have been used to test bioaccumulation of different contaminants such as manufactured nanomaterials , pesticides , and metals .

Taxonomic history

Hyalella azteca was first described by Henri Louis Frédéric de Saussure in 1858, under the name Amphitoe aztecus, based on material collected by Aztecs from a "cistern" near Veracruz, Mexico. It has also been described under several junior synonyms, including:
Hyalella dentata S. I. Smith, 1874
Hyalella fluvialis Lockington, 1877
Hyalella inermis S. I. Smith, 1875
Hyalella knickerbockeri Bate, 1862
Hyalella ornata Pearse, 1911
When Sidney Irving Smith erected the genus Hyalella in 1874, H. azteca was the only included species, and therefore the type species. The genus now includes dozens of species, mostly in South America.

H. azteca is now thought to represent a species complex, since there is little gene flow between populations, and different morphotypes are known to coexist in some areas. Two local populations have been described as separate species – Hyalella texana from the Edwards Plateau of Texas, and Hyalella montezuma from Montezuma Well, Arizona.
In addition to being a species complex, laboratory work sequencing and analyzing the genome of lab populations of Hyalella  azteca revealed Hyalella  azteca shares characteristics of other model organisms. [8]. How these crustaceans interact with contaminants can provide insight about how other species will interact with those same contaminants.

Genome Sequencing Project
There is an ongoing Hyalella azteca genome sequencing project.

This is part of a larger project being led by the Baylor college of Medicine Human Genome Sequencing Center (BCM-HGSC) ; in which 28 arthropod genomes are being sequenced.

The sequencing of these genomes serves as a beginning to the larger i5k initiative, which has an end goal of sequencing 5,000 Arthropoda. Scientists looking to contribute to this research are able to nominate species to sequence, and download and share data to i5k website. Data can also be submitted to the Global Genome biodiversity workshop Biodiversity Repository.

References

1] "Aquatic Invertebrates: Amphipods". The Nature of the Rideau River. Canadian Museum of 
Nature. May 18, 2007. Retrieved October 5, 2010.

[2] Mark D. Sytsma; Jeffery R. Cordell; John W. Chapman; Robyn C. Draheim (October 2004). 
"Final Technical Report: Appendices" (PDF). Lower Columbia River Aquatic Nonindigenous Species Survey 2001–2004. United States Fish and Wildlife Service. Archived from the original (PDF) on June 4, 2010. Retrieved October 6, 2010.

[3] C. F. Mason (2002). "Acidification". Biology of Freshwater Pollution (4th ed.). Pearson 
Education. pp. 175–204. .

[4] Douglas Grant Smith (2001). "Amphipoda". Pennak's freshwater invertebrates of the United States: Porifera to Crustacea (4th ed.). John Wiley and Sons. pp. 569–584. .

[5] N. Kaushik (1975). "Decomposition of allochthonous organic matter and secondary production 
in stream ecosystems". Productivity of World Ecosystems: Proceedings of a Symposium Presented August 31–September 1, 1972, at the V General Assembly of the Special Committee for the International Biological Program, Seattle, Washington. United States National Academy of Sciences. pp. 90–95. .

[6] Gary L. Krapu; Kenneth J. Reinecke (1992). "Foraging ecology and nutrition". In Bruce D. J. 
Batt (ed.). Ecology and Management of Breeding Waterfowl. University of Minnesota Press. pp. 1–29. .

[7] Robert Jay Goldstein; Rodney W. Harper; Richard Edwards (2000). "Foods and feeding". 
American Aquarium Fishes. Volume 28 of W. L. Moody, Jr., natural history series. Texas A&M University Press. pp. 43–51. .

[8] Poynton, H. et al. (2018). The Toxicogenome of Hyalella azteca: A Model for Sediment 
Ecotoxicology and Evolutionary Toxicology. Environmental  Science and Technology, 52(10), 6009–6022. https://doi.org/10.1021/acs.est.8b00837

[9] Nebeker, A; Miller, C. "Use of the amphipod crustacean Hyalella azteca in freshwater and 
estuarine sediment toxicity tests". EPA Science Inventory. Environmental Protection Agency. Retrieved 22 August 2017.

[10] Kuehr, S et al. (2020). Testing the bioaccumulation potential of manufactured nanomaterials 
in the freshwater amphipod Hyalella azteca. Chemosphere 263(2021),1. 
https://doi.org/10.1016/j.chemosphere.2020.127961

[11] Fulton, C et al. (2020). Fitness costs of pesticide resistance in Hyalella azteca under future 
climate change scenarios. Science of the Total Environment, 753(2021), 1. https://doi.org/10.1016/j.scitotenv.2020.141945

[12] Couillard, Y et al. (2008). The amphipod Hyalella azteca as a biomonitor in field deployment 
studies for metal mining. Environmental Pollution, 156(2008), 1314–1324. 
https://doi.org/10.1016/j.envpol.2008.03.001 	

[13] Yihao Duan; Sheldon I. Guttman; James T. Oris; A. John Bailer (2000). "Genetic structure 
and relationships among populations of Hyalella azteca and H. montezuma 
(Crustacea:Amphipoda)". Journal of the North American Benthological Society. 19 (2): 
308–320. doi:10.2307/1468073. JSTOR 1468073.

[14] Exequiel R. Gonzalez & Les Watling; Watling (2002). "Redescription of Hyalella azteca from 
its type locality, Vera Cruz, Mexico (Amphipoda: Hyalellidae)". Journal of Crustacean Biology. 22 (1): 173–183. doi:10.1651/0278-0372(2002)022[0173:ROHAFI]2.0.CO;2. JSTOR 1549618.

[15]J. Lowry (2010). J. Lowry (ed.). "Hyalella azteca (Saussure, 1858)". World Amphipoda

Further reading

Javidmehr A et al. (2015). 10- Day survival of Hyalella azteca as a function of water quality 
parameters. Ecotoxicology and Environmental Safety, 115(2015) 250–256. http://dx.doi.org/10.1016/j.ecoenv.2015.02.008

Fracácio, R et al. (2011). A comparative study of different diets to optimize cultivation of 
Hyalella azteca in the laboratory. Ecotoxicology and Environmental Safety, 74(2011), 1615–1618. https://doi.org/10.1016/j.ecoenv.2011.05.013

Sever, H et al. (2020). Recessivity of pyrethroid resistance and limited interspecies hybridization 
across Hyalella clades supports rapid and independent origins of resistance. Environmental Pollution, 266(2020).https://doi.org/10.1016/j.envpol.2020.115074

Christie, A et al. (2018). Prediction of a peptidome for the ecotoxicological model Hyalella 
azteca( Creustacea; Amphipoda) using a de novo assembled transcriptome. Marine Genomics, 38(2018), 67–88. https://doi.org/10.1016/j.margen.2017.12.003

Pedersen, S et al. (2013). Pairing Behavior and reproduction in Hyalella azteca as sensitive 
endpoints for detecting long-term consequences of pesticide pulses. Aquatic Toxicology, 
144-1445(2013), 59–65. https://dx.doi.org/10.1016/j.aquatox.2013.09.027

Gammaridea
Freshwater crustaceans of North America
Crustaceans described in 1858